60 South Sixth is a 40-story office tower and retail center located along Nicollet Mall in downtown Minneapolis, Minnesota that served as the U.S. headquarters for RBC Wealth Management until their move to RBC Gateway in 2022. The building was formerly known as Dain Rauscher Plaza for Dain Rauscher Wessels, a regional brokerage and investment banking firm based in Minneapolis. Following the 2000 acquisition of Dain Rauscher Wessels by the Royal Bank of Canada and 2008 end of use of the brand by RBC, the building was named RBC Plaza.

It is linked to the downtown core's 64 block skyway system with three separate skyway connections.

In 2014, the building was awarded LEED certification at the Gold level by the U.S. Green Building Council. The building was also awarded an Energy Star label in 2014 for its operating efficiency.

See also
List of tallest buildings in Minneapolis

References

External links
Emporis

External links 

 Official Website

Skyscraper office buildings in Minneapolis
Office buildings completed in 1992
1992 establishments in Minnesota
Royal Bank of Canada
Bank company headquarters in the United States